The Soviet Census conducted in January 1959 was the first post-World War II census held in the Soviet Union.

Background 
For a decade after World War II, there were no new population statistics released by the Soviet Union, and a proposal for a new Soviet census for 1949 was rejected by Soviet leader Joseph Stalin. During this time, most Western experts estimated that the population of the Soviet Union was between 215 and 220 million people, but in June 1956 (after Stalin's death), the Soviet government announced that the country's population at that point was only 200,200,000.

Results
The new census announced the Soviet Union's population to be 208,826,650, an increase of almost forty million from the results of the last (disputed) census from 1939. A majority of this population increase was due to the Soviet territorial expansion of the 1939–1945 time period, rather than due to natural population growth. The deficit of men to women in the total Soviet population massively increased between 1939 and 1959, in large part due to World War II. The Soviet Union acquired some additional territories (after its 1939 census) in 1939–1945 in what is now Ukraine, Belarus, Moldova, the Baltic republics, Karelia, Tuva, and Kaliningrad Oblast. The Soviet Union was just 33% urban in 1939, but urbanized rapidly to become almost half (48%) urban in 1959. 

The 1959 Soviet Union census reported populations in 126 nationality (ethnic group) categories, in comparison to only 97 categories in the 1939 census. Ethnic Russians still made up a majority of the Soviet population in 1959, but their percentage was smaller than in 1939 (again, partly due to the acquisition of mainly non-Russian territories in 1939–1945). Despite the acquisition of additional territories between these censuses, the Soviet Jewish population in 1959 (almost 2.3 million) was only about 75% of what it was in 1939, at least in large part due to the Holocaust. The populations of the Baltic Soviet Socialist Republics (which were heavily affected by World War II) did not change much between 1939 and 1959, with Lithuania actually experiencing a population decline during this time period. During the same time, the population of the Russian SFSR (which was heavily affected by World War II) increased by less than ten percent. The population increase in Ukraine and Byelorussia between 1939 and 1959 was completely or almost completely due to the Soviet territorial expansions of 1939–1940. Without these territorial expansions, Ukraine's population would have only barely increased and Belarus's population would have actually decreased between 1939 and 1959. The Central Asian and Caucasian Soviet Socialist Republics experienced large population increases between 1939 and 1959 despite the fact that they did not acquire any new territories during this time period.

City ranking

Moscow - 5,045,905
Leningrad - 3,321,196
Kiev - 1,104,334
Gor’ky - 941,962
Kharkiv - 934,136
Tashkent - 911,930
Novosibirsk - 885,045
Kuybyshev - 806,356
Sverdlovsk - 778,602
Stalino - 704,821
Tbilisi - 694,664
Chelyabinsk - 689,049
Odessa - 667,182
Dnepropetrovsk - 661,547
Baku - 652,507
Kazan - 646,806
Perm - 629,118
Rostov-on-Don - 599,542
Stalingrad - 593,844
Omsk - 581,108
Riga - 580,423
Ufa - 546,878
Minsk - 509,500
Yerevan - 509,340

Ethnic groups
Russians - 114,113,579
Ukrainians - 37,252,930
Byelorussians - 7,913,488
Uzbeks - 6,015,416
Tatars - 4,917,991
Kazakhs - 3,621,610
Azerbaijanis - 2,939,728
Armenians - 2,786,912
Georgians - 2,691,950
Lithuanians - 2,326,094
Jews - 2,266,334
Moldovans - 2,214,139
Germans - 1,619,655
Chuvash people - 1,469,766
Latvians - 1,399,539
Tajiks - 1,396,939
Poles - 1,380,282
Mordvins - 1,285,116
Turkmens - 1,001,585
Bashkirs - 989,040
Estonians - 988,616
Kyrgyz people - 968,659

References

Ethnic groups in Russia
Census
Censuses in the Soviet Union
Soviet Union